The Jewel Thieves Outwitted is a 1913 silent film short directed by Frank Wilson. It starred Jack Hulcup, Violet Hopson, Rachel de Solla.

Cast
Jack Hulcup - The Thief
Violet Hopson - The Maid
Rachel de Solla - Lady Randall

References

External links

lobby poster(heritageauctions)

1913 films
Films directed by Frank Wilson
British silent short films
British black-and-white films
British crime films
1910s crime films
1910s British films